Lavio is one of 28 parishes (administrative divisions) in Salas, a municipality within the province and autonomous community of Asturias, in northern Spain.

Villages
Brañasivil
Buscabrero
Bustoto
El Acebal
El Cándano
Faedo
Las Gallinas
Lavio
Pende
Socolina

References

Parishes in Salas